Young Love is the first single to be released from Mystery Jets' second album Twenty One. It was released on 10 March 2008, on CD, two 7" singles and digital download. Unlike most Mystery Jets songs, which are sung by Blaine Harrison, the band's guitarist William Rees sings lead vocals on the song. The song also features guest vocals from singer/songwriter Laura Marling.

Track listings

CD
 "Young Love (feat. Laura Marling)" - 3:25
 "Uber Liebe Gold (Flakes Dictaphone Demo)" - 3:05

7" vinyl
 "Young Love (feat. Laura Marling)" - 3:25
 "Metal Soul" - 3:01

7" vinyl
 "Young Love (Shoes Remix)" - 2:50
 "Girl Shaped Gun" -  3:43

External links
 Official website

2008 singles
Mystery Jets songs
2008 songs
679 Artists singles